High Point Township is a township in Decatur County, Iowa, USA.  As of the 2000 census, its population was 169.

Geography
High Point Township covers an area of 36.43 square miles (94.37 square kilometers); of this, 0.02 square miles (0.04 square kilometers) or 0.04 percent is water. The streams of Cobbville Creek, Conner Branch and Jonathan Creek run through this township.

Unincorporated towns
 High Point
(This list is based on USGS data and may include former settlements.)

Adjacent townships
 Garden Grove Township (north)
 Richman Township, Wayne County (northeast)
 Clay Township, Wayne County (east)
 Jefferson Township, Wayne County (southeast)
 Woodland Township (south)
 Eden Township (southwest)
 Center Township (west)
 Franklin Township (northwest)

Cemeteries
The township contains three cemeteries: High Point, McCullough and Trullinger.

Major highways

References
 U.S. Board on Geographic Names (GNIS)
 United States Census Bureau cartographic boundary files

External links
 US-Counties.com
 City-Data.com

Townships in Decatur County, Iowa
Townships in Iowa